The Portarlington Football Netball Club, nicknamed the Demons, is an Australian rules football and netball club situated in the township of Portarlington, Victoria, on the Bellarine Peninsula. Portarlington teams currently play in the Bellarine Football League and its home ground is the  Portarlington Recreation Reserve, Portarlington.

History 
The club was established in 1874. The club played in an early version Bellarine Football League that ran from 1895 to 1914. Reformed after World War I, the club continued to play locally until 1923 when it joined the Geelong Football Association. Portarlington used to wear the red and black Essendon jumper, but this clashed with Birreguarra when the club changed leagues. 

A new strip based on the Melbourne jumper of red and blue was adopted. The Portarlington Football Club played the 1964 season in the Polwarth Football League and continued in this league until the Bellarine District Football League was formed in 1971. Portarlington was a founding club and P. Harrison won the goalkicking that year.
 
Since joining the Bellarine District Football League the club has a winning rate of 49.7%. For two seasons in the 1990s the club was Portarlington-St Leonards, but later reverted to its original name.

Premierships  
 Queenscliff & Bellarine Football Association (3): 1906, 1909, 1911
 Geelong & District Football League: 
 Woolworths Cup (1): 1947
 Jarman Cup (3): 1953, 1958, 1959
 Bellarine Football League (2): 1978, 1992

Notable VFL/AFL players 
 Barry Smith
 Jim Nash with Geelong 
 John Hyde with Geelong 
 Barry Ward with Geelong 
 Barrie Bretland with Geelong 
 Max Trewin with Geelong 
 Scott Allen with Footscray

References

External links 
 Official website

Bellarine Football League
Australian rules football clubs in Victoria (Australia)
Sports clubs established in 1874
Australian rules football clubs established in 1874
1874 establishments in Australia
Netball teams in Victoria (Australia)